In Christian theology, ecclesiology is the study of the Church, the origins of Christianity, its relationship to Jesus, its role in salvation, its polity, its discipline, its eschatology, and its leadership.

In its early history, one of the Church's primary ecclesiological issues had to do with the status of Gentile members in what had become the New Testament fulfilment of the essentially Jewish Old Testament church. It later contended with such questions as whether it was to be governed by a council of presbyters or a single bishop, how much authority the bishop of Rome had over other major bishops, the role of the Church in the world, whether salvation was possible outside of the institution of the Church, the relationship between the Church and the State, and questions of theology and liturgy and other issues. Ecclesiology may be used in the specific sense of a particular church or denomination's character, self-described or otherwise. This is the sense of the word in such phrases as Catholic ecclesiology, Protestant ecclesiology, and ecumenical ecclesiology.

The word ecclesiology was defined in the 19th century as the science of the building and decoration of church buildings and is still used in that sense in the context of architectural history.

Etymology

The similar word ecclesialogy first appeared in the quarterly journal The British Critic in 1837, in an article written by an anonymous contributor who defined it thus: 

However, in volume 4 of the Cambridge Camden Society's journal The Ecclesiologist, published in January 1845, that society (the CCS) claimed that they had invented the word ecclesiology: 

The Ecclesiologist was first published in October 1841 and dealt with the study of the building and decoration of churches. It particularly encouraged the restoration of Anglican churches back to their supposed Gothic splendour and it was at the centre of the wave of Victorian restoration that spread across England and Wales in the second half of the 19th century. Its successor Ecclesiology Today is still, being published by The Ecclesiological Society (successor to the CCS, now a registered charity).

The situation regarding the etymology has been summed up by Alister McGrath: "'Ecclesiology' is a term that has changed its meaning in recent theology. Formerly the science of the building and decoration of churches, promoted by the Cambridge Camden Society, the Ecclesiological Society and the journal The Ecclesiologist, ecclesiology now stands for the study of the nature of the Christian church."

Catholic ecclesiology 

Catholic ecclesiology today has a plurality of models and views, as with all Catholic Theology since the acceptance of scholarly Biblical criticism that began in the early to mid 20th century.  This shift is most clearly marked by the encyclical Divino afflante Spiritu in 1943. Avery Robert Cardinal Dulles, S.J. contributed greatly to the use of models in understanding ecclesiology. In his work Models of the Church, he defines five basic models of Church that have been prevalent throughout the history of the Catholic Church. These include models of the Church as institution, as mystical communion, as sacrament, as herald, and as servant.

The ecclesiological model of Church as an Institution holds that the Catholic Church alone is the "one, holy, catholic and apostolic Church", and is the only Church of divine and apostolic origin led by the Pope. This view of the Church is dogmatically defined Catholic doctrine, and is therefore de fide. In this view, the Catholic Church— composed of all baptized, professing Catholics, both clergy and laity—is the unified, visible society founded by Christ himself, and its hierarchy derives its spiritual authority through the centuries, via apostolic succession of its bishops, most especially through the bishop of Rome (the Pope) whose successorship comes from St. Peter the Apostle, to whom Christ gave "the keys to the Kingdom of Heaven". Thus, the Popes, in the Catholic view, have a God-ordained universal jurisdiction over the whole Church on earth. The Catholic Church is considered Christ's mystical body, and the universal sacrament of salvation, whereby Christ enables human to receive sanctifying grace.

The model of Church as Mystical Communion draws on two major Biblical images, the first of the "Mystical Body of Christ" (as developed in Paul's Epistles) and the second of the "People of God." This image goes beyond the Aristotelian-Scholastic model of "Communitas Perfecta" held in previous centuries. This ecclesiological model draws upon sociology and articulations of two types of social relationships: a formally organized or structured society (Gesellschaft) and an informal or interpersonal community (Gemeinschaft). The Catholic theologian Arnold Rademacher maintained that the Church in its inner core is community (Gemeinschaft) and in its outer core society (Gesellschaft). Here, the interpersonal aspect of the Church is given primacy and that the structured Church is the result of a real community of believers. Similarly, Yves Congar argued that the ultimate reality of the Church is a fellowship of persons.  This ecclesiology opens itself to ecumenism and was the prevailing model used by the Second Vatican Council in its ecumenical efforts. The Council, using this model, recognized in its document Lumen gentium that the Body of Christ subsists in a visible society governed by the Successor of Peter and by the Bishops in communion with him, although many elements of sanctification and of truth are found outside its visible structure.

Eastern Orthodox ecclesiology
From the Eastern Orthodox perspective, the Church is one, even though it is manifested in many places. Eastern Orthodox ecclesiology operates with a plurality in unity and a unity in plurality. For Eastern Orthodoxy there is no 'either / or' between the one and the many. No attempt is made to subordinate the many to the one (the Roman Catholic model), nor the one to the many (the Protestant model). In this view, it is both canonically and theologically correct to speak of the Church and the churches, and vice versa. Historically, that ecclesiological concept was applied in practice as patriarchal pentarchy, embodied in ecclesiastical unity of five major patriarchal thrones (Rome, Constantinople, Alexandria, Antioch and Jerusalem).

There is disagreement between the Ecumenical Patriarchate of Constantinople and the Patriarchate of Moscow on the question of separation between ecclesiological and theological primacy and separation of the different ecclesiological levels: 
Position of the Moscow Patriarchate on the problem of primacy in the Universal Church
First without Equals. A Response to the Text on Primacy of the Moscow Patriarchate, by Elpidophoros Lambriniadis, Metropolitan of Bursa

Ecclesiology of the Church of the East
Historical development of the Church of the East outside the political borders of the Late Roman Empire and its eastern successor, the Byzantine Empire, resulted in the creation of its distinctive theological and ecclesiological traditions, regarding not only the questions of internal institutional and administrative organization of the Church, but also the questions of universal ecclesiastical order.

Protestant ecclesiology

Magisterial Reformation ecclesiology 
Martin Luther argued that because the Catholic Church had "lost sight of the doctrine of grace", it had "lost its claim to be considered as the authentic Christian church". This argument was open to the counter-criticism from Catholics that he was thus guilty of schism and the heresy of Donatism, and in both cases therefore opposing central teachings of the early Church and most especially the Church father St. Augustine of Hippo. It also challenged the Catholic doctrine that the Catholic Church was indefectible and infallible in its dogmatic teachings.

Radical Reformation ecclesiology 
There is no single "Radical Reformation Ecclesiology". A variety of views is expressed among the various "Radical Reformation" participants.

A key "Radical Reformer" was Menno Simons, known as an "Anabaptist". He wrote:

This was in direct contrast to the hierarchical, sacramental ecclesiology that characterised the incumbent Roman Catholic tradition as well as the new Lutheran and other prominent Protestant movements of the Reformation.

Some other Radical Reformation ecclesiology holds that "the true church [is] in heaven, and no institution of any kind on earth merit[s] the name 'church of God.'"

See also

 Great Church
 East–West Schism § Ecclesiological disputes (Eastern Orthodox theology)
 Branch theory (Anglican theology)
For historical Protestant ecclesiology, see
 Augsburg Confession, Article XXVIII: Of Ecclesiastical Power
 1689 Baptist Confession of Faith, Chapter 26: Of the Church
 Theology of John Calvin § Ecclesiology and sacraments

Notes

References

Sources

Further reading
 Flanagan, Donal, ed. The Meaning of the Church: Papers of the Maynooth Union Summer School, 1965. Dublin, Ire.: Gill and Son, 1966. N.B.: Mostly concerns the Roman Catholic Church's own ecclesiology, but also includes a lengthy chapter on the Reformed/Presbyterian standpoint, "The Church in Protestant Theology".

External links 

 Ecclesiology journal
 A primer on Eastern Orthodox and Roman Catholic ecclesiology from an Orthodox perspective
 Eucharist, Bishop, Church: The Unity of the Church in the Divine Eucharist and the Bishop during the First Three Centuries by the Professor Metropolitan of Pergamus and Chairman of the Athens Academy John Zizioulas

 
Christian terminology
Systematic theology